Charles van Beveren (1809–1850), was a Belgian artist, who spent much of his life in Amsterdam.

Life
He was born at Mechlin in 1809, and studied art at the academy of his native city and at Antwerp. He settled in Amsterdam in 1830, subsequently visiting Paris, Rome, and other cities of Italy, and distinguished himself as a painter of history, genre, and portraits. He died at Amsterdam in 1850.

In 1850, Van Beveren was elected a correspondent, living in the Netherlands, of the Royal Institute of the Netherlands, predecessor of the Royal Netherlands Academy of Arts and Sciences.

Works

His best known of his works are:
Louis Royer and his wife, pendant marriage portraits now in Rijksmuseum Amsterdam.
The Confession of a Sick Girl (in the Pinakothek at Munich).
Male Figure. A study (in the Rotterdam Museum).
The Vision of St. Ignatius.
The Death of St. Anthony of Padua (in the church of Moses and Aaron at Amsterdam, his chef-d'oeuvre).

References

Sources
 

1809 births
1850 deaths
Artists from Mechelen
Dutch painters
Dutch male painters
Members of the Royal Netherlands Academy of Arts and Sciences
Royal Academy of Fine Arts (Antwerp) alumni
19th-century Belgian painters
19th-century Belgian male artists
19th-century male artists